The Revolt of Horea, Cloșca and Crișan (31 October – 14 December, 1784) began in the Metaliferi Mountains, Transylvania, but it soon spread throughout all Transylvania and the Apuseni Mountains. The leaders were Horea (Vasile Ursu Nicola, 1731–1785), Cloșca (1747–1785) and Crișan (1733–1785).

Background
The revolt was directly related to the poor conditions of feudal serfs in the Principality of Transylvania. Though Orthodox Romanians lacked political equality with Catholic subjects in Transylvania.

After Holy Roman Emperor Leopold I's incorporation of the principality into the Habsburg domains in 1691, the rights of the Hungarian, Székely, and Saxon nobles were preserved. The peasants however, still had no representation in politics. Especially the Romanian peasantry had no guarantees for their Orthodox church institutions, though they were tolerated.

The revolt

As representative for the Romanian peasants, Horea — whose official name was Vasile Ursu Nicola — traveled to Vienna often in the years from 1779 to 1782 to explain the hardships of the Transylvanian peasantry and lack of representation, without any result. The trigger of the events was started on 31 January 1784 when Emperor Joseph II issued an order to increase the number of the border guards of Transylvania, many men from many villages assembled in Alba Iulia to enroll in the army as an option to live better instead of the obligatory labor system to their landlords. Most of them were Romanian peasants. The local authorities tried to slow down the process assuming the Gubernium got around and did not involve them. The people interpreted this action as the "nobility" opposing their chance for a better fate for their families. Horea spread a rumor that Joseph II appointed him as leader of the Romanians who wished to enroll into service, while Crișan called the serfs to revolt in the surrounding areas of the Crișul Alb (Fehér-Kőrös) river. Therefore, more than ten-thousand people united against the "nobility" who in their eyes were the oppressors imposing high taxes on them. Shortly, the tensions culminated into a revolt, targeting the nobles and the non-Orthodox common people (regardless of ethnicity), because they unfairly received opportunity for advancement in society. The massacres mostly affected the areas and population of Alsó-Fehér County, Zaránd County, and Hunyad County. Between the autumn of 1784 and the winter up to 1785, civilian casualties were about 4,000 people from 133 settlements, mostly Hungarians.

While the Gubernium and the military leadership debated about a possible intervention – awaiting the order from Vienna, the Hungarian nobility took action: they organized their defence, they captured and trialed the rioters in Deva (Déva), and executed 56 peasants.

When Joseph II ordered the army to intervene, the uprising was ended by Horea on 14 December 1784, at Câmpeni (Topánfalva, Topesdorf). In January 1785, the leaders were captured for treason, after a bounty had been put on their heads. From the more than 600 captured rebels, 120 were sentenced; 37 death penalties were delivered initially but they were changed to imprisonment as a result of the amnesty of the emperor, with an exception regarding the three leaders. Horea and Cloșca were executed by the Hungarian authorities by breaking on the wheel on 28 February 1785 at Dealul Furcilor (Gabelberg, Forks Hill), Alba Iulia (Gyulafehérvár). Crișan hanged himself on the night before the execution.

Legacy
After the revolt had been put down, Joseph II responded by enacting a Patent for the Abolition of Serfdom for Transylvania in 1785. This put an end to serfdom, although the feudal system continued to be practiced for several more decades. The Emperor also ended aristocratic control over peasant marriages and expanded the peasants’ grazing rights.

The uprising reverberated throughout Western Europe. It upset the feudal system and is considered by many to have inspired the French Revolution. In 1785, Jacques Pierre Brissot, who would become a leader of the French Revolution, published an open letter to Joseph II in which he asserted the right of royal subjects to protest.

See also
Horea, Cloșca și Crișan Division

References

Sources

External links

Conflicts in 1784
Conflicts in 1785
Peasant revolts
History of Transylvania (1683–1848)
18th-century rebellions
1784 in Europe
1785 in Europe
Riots and civil disorder in Romania
Hungary–Romania relations
Joseph II, Holy Roman Emperor